Azimo B.V. was an online remittance service headquartered in Amsterdam, Netherlands. It also had offices in Kraków, Poland.

Azimo offered money transfers to 190 receiving countries in over 80 different currencies. The company had half a million customers connected to its platform and offered more than 270,000 cash pick-up locations globally. As of October 2019, sending countries were limited to Europe.

In March 2022, Azimo was acquired by the New York-based payroll and payments solutions provider, Papaya Global. and closed their money transfer services in August 2022.

History
Azimo was founded in October 2012 in London, United Kingdom. In 2016, an updated version of its app was launched with features including in-app chat and biometric security.

As of early 2016, Azimo had raised $31 million in Series A and B funding from investors including Frog Capital, Greycroft, MCI.TechVentures, e.ventures and Quona Capital. In May 2016, Japanese e-commerce company Rakuten invested in Azimo to accelerate the company's expansion into Asia.

In 2020, Azimo moved to the Netherlands as a result of Brexit. Two years later it was acquired by Papaya Global and stopped operating.

Operations
Azimo offered money transfers to 190 receiving countries in over 80 different currencies. The company had half a million customers connected to its platform and offers more than 270,000 cash pick-up locations globally. In 2016, an updated version of its app was launched with features including in-app chat and biometric security.

As of October 2019, sending countries were limited to Europe that are primarily in the EU. The list of sending countries is:

References

Financial services companies established in 2012
Online remittance providers
Financial technology companies
Companies based in Amsterdam